Break Media was an American digital media company that owned several Internet properties targeted at men (males aged 18–34 make up 70% of their visitors), including Break.com (its first website), Screen Junkies, CagePotato, Chickipedia, HolyTaco, MadeMan, AllLeftTurns, TuVez and GameFront. It was founded in June 1998 by Keith Richman. From then until its eventual merger, the company's websites experienced significant growth. Traffic across all of its websites grew by 35% in 2009, with 27.9 million visitors in February 2010. The company's network of websites, many of which create original video content, made it the 11th most popular video network online in 2010. In October 2013, Break Media merged with Alloy Digital to create Defy Media.

References

Further reading
 
 "In Time For The iPad, Dude-Centric Video Network Break Media Boards The HTML5 Train", TechCrunch. Retrieved 7 July 7 2010.
 Fritz, Ben, "Break.com's low-brow fare is right on target". Los Angeles Times, 2 March 2010. Retrieved 7 July 2010.

External links
 Official website

Defunct online companies of the United States
Internet properties established in 1998